People to Each Other is a 1926 German silent film directed by Gerhard Lamprecht and starring Alfred Abel, Aud Egede-Nissen, and Eduard Rothauser. The film's art direction was by Otto Moldenhauer.

Cast

References

Bibliography

External links

1926 films
Films of the Weimar Republic
German silent feature films
Films set in Berlin
Films directed by Gerhard Lamprecht
National Film films
German black-and-white films